Roland Schwarz (born 14 August 1996) is a German Greco-Roman wrestler. He won the silver medal in the 77 kg event at the 2019 European Wrestling Championships held in Bucharest, Romania. In the final, he lost against Roman Vlasov of Russia. Chechen by nationality.

In 2020, he won one of the bronze medals in the 82 kg event at the Individual Wrestling World Cup held in Belgrade, Serbia.

He won one of the bronze medals in the 77 kg event at the 2021 World Wrestling Championships held in Oslo, Norway. He competed in the 82kg event at the 2022 World Wrestling Championships held in Belgrade, Serbia.

Achievements

References

External links 
 

Living people
1996 births
Place of birth missing (living people)
German male sport wrestlers
European Wrestling Championships medalists
World Wrestling Championships medalists
20th-century German people
21st-century German people